Bathymunida avatea is a species of squat lobster in the family Munididae. The name is derived from the goddess of the moon, Avatea, in Cook Islands mythology.

References

Squat lobsters
Crustaceans described in 2006